Sunbirds and spiderhunters form the family Nectariniidae. The International Ornithological Committee (IOC) recognizes these 146 species distributed among 16 genera. 

This list is presented according to the IOC taxonomic sequence and can also be sorted alphabetically by common name and binomial.

References

S
Nectariniidae